Llanymynech and Pant is a civil parish in Shropshire, England.  The population of the parish is approximately 1,675.

The two main villages within the parish are Llanymynech and Pant, though only the English half of Llanymynech is in the parish as the other half is in Powys, Wales.

See also
Listed buildings in Llanymynech and Pant

References

Civil parishes in Shropshire